Acacia quadrisulcata is a shrub of the genus Acacia and the subgenus Phyllodineae endemic to Western Australia.

Description

It blooms from September to December and produces yellow flowers. The simple inflorescences are arranged with one per axil with spherical flower-heads containing 15 to 20 light golden flowers that turn orange-brown when dry.

The phyllodes resemble those of Acacia tetragonophylla and the acicular phyllode variant of Acacia maitlandii.

Taxonomy
The species was first formally described by the botanist Ferdinand von Mueller in 1863 as part of the work Fragmenta Phytographiae Australiae. It was reclassified as Racosperma quadrisulcatum by Leslie Pedley in 2003 then transferred back to the genus Acacia'' in 2006.

Distribution
It is native to an area between Northampton and Shark Bay in the Mid West region of Western Australia where it is found on sand plains and sandhills growing in sandy clay soils over limestone or laterite. The shrub is usually part of a heath or shrubland communities.

See also
 List of Acacia species

References

quadrisulcata
Acacias of Western Australia
Taxa named by Ferdinand von Mueller
Plants described in 1863